Blue Exorcist is an anime series adapted from the manga of the same title by Kazue Kato. It is directed by Tensai Okamura and produced by A-1 Pictures. It began broadcasting in Japan on the MBS TV and the TBS Television on April 17, 2011, the anime then ended on October 2, 2011. The series was originally scheduled to start airing on April 10, 2011, however due to the 2011 Tōhoku earthquake and tsunami, the series' initial broadcast was delayed by a week. The episodes are being simulcasted with English subtitles online via Hulu, Anime News Network, and Crunchyroll, starting on April 20, 2011. Aniplex of America released Blue Exorcist on DVD in four sets, starting by releasing the first DVD on October 18, 2011.

Four pieces of theme music are used for the episodes: two opening themes and two ending themes. The opening theme for the first 12 episodes is "Core Pride" by Uverworld, while the opening theme from episode 13 onwards is "In My World" by Rookiez is Punk'd. The ending theme for the first 12 episodes is "Take Off" by South Korean boy band 2PM, while the ending theme from episode 13 onwards is "Wired Life" by Meisa Kuroki.


Episode list

References

Blue Exorcist episode lists
2011 Japanese television seasons